Procloeon is a genus of small minnow mayflies in the family Baetidae. There are at least 20 described species in Procloeon.

Species

References

Further reading

 
 

Mayfly genera